The Greatest Marriage is a 2014 South Korean television series based on the novel of the same title by Jung Yi-joon. Starring Park Si-yeon, Bae Soo-bin and No Min-woo, it airs on TV Chosun beginning September 27, 2014.

Synopsis
Cha Ki-young is a popular news anchorwoman. She is smart, capable, glamorous, nationally beloved, and ranked at the top of female college students' "women I want to emulate" lists. Ambitious and confrontational, she doesn't take well to being out-shined, particularly when it comes to her workplace rival, the station's other elite news anchor, Jo Eun-cha.

Cool-headed and rational, Jo Eun-cha is a talented and driven anchorman who commands as well as demands respect. After failing to get elected as an assemblyman, he aims to return to his job as the top news anchor to increase his chances of being elected the next year.

Park Tae-yeon is the only son of a leading chaebol group that owns a news corporation. He studied abroad, but goes against his father's hopes of continuing the family business when he dropped out of business school to go to a culinary school. After graduation, he becomes a reporter who covers the food and lifestyle beat.

Ki-young is dating Tae-yeon, and neither are interested in the idea of marriage. But when Ki-young accidentally becomes pregnant and Tae-yeon refuses to take responsibility, she decides to have the child out of wedlock and raise it on her own as a single mother. This crucial choice takes her from that coveted spot at the top, and she goes from headlining the 9 o'clock news on her own to being the subject of scorn and scandal. Ki-young is replaced by Kang Ha-ni as the co-anchor.  Unexpectedly, Eun-cha decides to become a surrogate father to Ki-young's child.

Cast
 Park Si-yeon as Cha Ki-young
 Bae Soo-bin as Jo Eun-cha
 No Min-woo as Park Tae-yeon
 Uhm Hyun-kyung as Hyun Myung-yi
 Jung Ga-yeon as Na Yeon-hee
 Song Young-kyu as Choi Il-joong
 Park Hye-jin as Jung Soon-young
 Park Ji-il as Seo Hoi-pyung
 Kim Jin-ho as Ahn Jong-rak
 Kim Seung-hoon as Kim Ho-nam
 Jo Eun-ji as Park Seon-nyeo
 Jang Ki-yong as Bae Deu-ro
 Lee Jung-gil as Park Kang-rok
 Yoon Mi-ra as Jeon Ryeo-ja
 Heo Joon-seok as Kim Joon-young
 Park Sojin as Lee Yuri
 Lee Young-lan
 Jung Se-hyung
 Choi Jae-sub
 Son Se-bin as Kang Ha-ni

International broadcast
  - TV STAR SCTV11 - 01/01/2016

References
t

External links
 The Best Wedding official TV Chosun website 
 

2014 South Korean television series debuts
2014 South Korean television series endings
TV Chosun television dramas
Television shows based on South Korean novels